Follicle may refer to:
Follicle (anatomy), a small spherical group of cells containing a cavity:
 Dental follicle
 Hair follicle 
 Lymph follicle
 Ovarian follicle
 Thyroid follicle
Follicle (fruit)

See also
Follicular lymphoma, a common form of blood cancer